Bulgoksan (불곡산; 佛谷山) is the name of two mountains in South Korea:

Bulgoksan (Seongnam/Gwangju) is in Seongnam and Gwangju, Gyeonggi-do
Bulgoksan (Yangju) is in Yangju, Gyeonggi-do